Senator Griswold may refer to:

Members of the United States Senate
Dwight Griswold (1893–1954), U.S. Senator from Nebraska from 1952 to 1954
Stanley Griswold (1763–1815), U.S. Senator from Ohio in 1809

United States state senate members
George Griswold (died 1857), Michigan State Senate
Harry W. Griswold (1886–1939), Wisconsin State Senate
Whiting Griswold (1814–1874), Massachusetts State Senate
William M. Griswold (1823–1889), Wisconsin State Senate